Charlie Ventura (born Charles Venturo; December 2, 1916 – January 17, 1992) was an American tenor saxophonist and bandleader from Philadelphia, Pennsylvania, United States.

Career
During the 1940s, Ventura played saxophone for the bands of Gene Krupa and Teddy Powell. In 1945 he was named best tenor saxophonist by DownBeat magazine. He led a band which included Conte Candoli, Bennie Green, Boots Mussulli, Ed Shaughnessy, Jackie Cain, and Roy Kral. He led big bands in the 1940s and 1950s and formed the Big Four with Buddy Rich, Marty Napoleon, and Chubby Jackson. He was a sideman with Krupa through the 1960s, then worked in Las Vegas with comedian Jackie Gleason. In 1992 he died of lung cancer.

Discography
 Stomping with the Sax (Crystalette, 1950)
 Gene Norman Presents a Charlie Ventura Concert (Decca, 1953)
 F.Y.I. (EmArcy, 1954)
 In Concert (GNP, 1954)
 An Evening with Charlie Ventura and Mary Ann McCall (Norgran, 1954)
 Another Evening with Charlie Ventura and Mary Ann McCall (Norgran, 1954)
 Jumping with Ventura (EmArcy, 1955)
 An Evening with Mary Ann McCall and Charlie Ventura (Norgran, 1955)
 Charlie Ventura's Carnegie Hall Concert (Norgran, 1955)
 The New Charlie Ventura in Hi-Fi (Baton, 1956)
 Plays Hi-Fi Jazz (Tops, 1957)
 Crazy Rhythms (Regent, 1957)
 Adventure with Charlie (King, 1957)
 Here's Charlie (Brunswick, 1957)
 East of Suez (Regent, 1958)
 A Battle of Saxes (King, 1959)
 Plays for the People (Craftsmen, 1960)
 Live at the 3 Deuces! (Phoenix Jazz, 1975)
 Aces at the Deuces (Phoenix Jazz, 1976)

As sideman
 Dizzy Gillespie, The Complete RCA Victor Recordings (Bluebird, 1995)
 Gene Krupa, The Great New Gene Krupa Quartet Featuring Charlie Ventura (Verve, 1964)

References

1916 births
1992 deaths
Jazz musicians from Pennsylvania
20th-century American male musicians
20th-century American saxophonists
American conductors (music)
American jazz bandleaders
American jazz tenor saxophonists
American male conductors (music)
American male saxophonists
American people of Italian descent
Bebop saxophonists
Deaths from cancer in New Jersey
Deaths from lung cancer
American male jazz musicians
Swing saxophonists
HighNote Records artists
Brunswick Records artists
EmArcy Records artists